Celine Loader is a Nigerian business strategist and entrepreneur. In 2015, she served as the communications consultant for the Central Bank of Nigeria.

Education and career 
Celine Loader has a Bachelor of Science in agriculture from the University of London Wye College and a master's degree in Development economics from the University of Reading, United Kingdom.

Her career started out at Microsoft UK, where she steadily rose through the ranks to become the Regional Product Marketing Manager, where she managed the Africa and Middle East region. She worked at Microsoft for 8 years before she went on to Aspire Media Ltd.

On her return to Nigeria in 2006, she worked as the Divisional Head of Brand and Communications at United Bank for Africa (UBA) where she eventually became Group Director, Marketing and Corporate Relations.

Awards and recognition

 Special Recognition Award' by the Africa Movie Academy Awards (AMAA) 2017
 Top 50 outstanding Cameroonians by Dulce Camer (2009)
 Exquisite Magazine Female Banker of the Year (2009);
 Mode Men Magazine Woman of the Year (2009);
 Vanguard Allure Magazine's Style Icon (2008);
 Role Model Award by GOTNI – Guardians of the Nation International (2007); 
 Outstanding Achievement in Media by European Federation of Black women business owners (2005);
 Excellence in Media Award by GAB (Gathering of Africa's Best, 2006)

References 

Living people
Year of birth missing (living people)
Nigerian women in business
Alumni of the University of London
Alumni of the University of Reading
Alumni of Wye College